Gandel is a surname. Notable people with the surname include:

 John Gandel (born 1935), Australian businessman, property developer, and philanthropist
 Pauline Gandel, Australian philanthropist, wife of John

See also
 Gander (surname)
 Handel (name)
 Mandel